United Kingdoms may refer to:

 United Kingdoms of Denmark–Norway
 United Kingdoms of Denmark–Norway–Sweden
 United Kingdoms of Sweden and Norway
 United Kingdoms (album)

See also
 United Kingdom (disambiguation)